The 2001 Berlin state election was held on 21 October 2001 to elect the members of the 15th Abgeordnetenhaus of Berlin. Prior to the election, Mayor Klaus Wowereit had led a minority government of the Social Democratic Party (SPD) and The Greens since June, which had replaced a coalition between the Christian Democratic Union (CDU) and SPD which collapsed in June. The SPD–Green government made gains, but remained short of a majority. The SPD first sought to form a traffic light coalition with the Free Democratic Party (FDP) and Greens, but were unsuccessful. They subsequently agreed to a government with the Party of Democratic Socialism (PDS).

Parties
The table below lists parties represented in the 14th Abgeordnetenhaus of Berlin.

Issues and campaign
The 2001 election was an early election. In June 2001, the grand coalition under Mayor Eberhard Diepgen (CDU) broke down following a scandal involving CDU's leader in the Abgeordnetenhaus of Berlin, . Landowsky, who served as the CEO of a public mortgage bank (later Landesbank Berlin Holding), had financed a risky deal between two men who were donors to the local CDU branch. The  cost the city several billion euros. The SPD subsequently left the coalition, which had governed Berlin since 1990, and formed an interim minority government with the Greens supported by the PDS. Klaus Wowereit became Mayor after a constructive vote of no confidence against Diepgen on 15 June. The House of Deputies then voted to dissolve itself, triggering a new election.

The campaign was strongly influenced by the bad state of the public finances and the bank scandal. The CDU nominated 35-year-old Frank Steffel as their top candidate, and played on fears of potential PDS involvement in government. They also focused on security issues, especially after September 11 attacks.

The regional broadcaster Sender Freies Berlin accompanied the election campaign on its website with a "Wahltest" app, marking the first time in Germany that a Voting Advice Application was used.

Opinion polling

Election result

|-
! colspan="2" | Party
! Votes
! %
! +/-
! Seats 
! +/-
! Seats %
|-
| bgcolor=| 
| align=left | Social Democratic Party (SPD)
| align=right| 481,772
| align=right| 29.7
| align=right| 7.3
| align=right| 44
| align=right| 2
| align=right| 31.2
|-
| bgcolor=| 
| align=left | Christian Democratic Union (CDU)
| align=right| 385,692
| align=right| 23.8
| align=right| 17.0
| align=right| 35
| align=right| 41
| align=right| 24.8
|-
| bgcolor=| 
| align=left | Party of Democratic Socialism (PDS)
| align=right| 366,292
| align=right| 22.6
| align=right| 4.9
| align=right| 33
| align=right| 0
| align=right| 23.4
|-
| bgcolor=| 
| align=left | Free Democratic Party (FDP)
| align=right| 160,953
| align=right| 9.9
| align=right| 7.7
| align=right| 15
| align=right| 15
| align=right| 10.6
|-
| bgcolor=| 
| align=left | Alliance 90/The Greens (Grüne)
| align=right| 148,066
| align=right| 9.1
| align=right| 0.8
| align=right| 14
| align=right| 4
| align=right| 9.9
|-
! colspan=8|
|-
|  
| align=left | The Grays – Gray Panthers (Graue)
| align=right| 22,093
| align=right| 1.4
| align=right| 0.3
| align=right| 0
| align=right| ±0
| align=right| 0
|-
| bgcolor=| 
| align=left | The Republicans (REP)
| align=right| 21,836
| align=right| 1.3
| align=right| 1.4
| align=right| 0
| align=right| ±0
| align=right| 0
|-
| bgcolor=|
| align=left | Others
| align=right| 36,634
| align=right| 2.3
| align=right| 
| align=right| 0
| align=right| ±0
| align=right| 0
|-
! align=right colspan=2| Total
! align=right| 1,623,338
! align=right| 100.0
! align=right| 
! align=right| 141
! align=right| 28
! align=right| 
|-
! align=right colspan=2| Voter turnout
! align=right| 
! align=right| 68.1
! align=right| 2.6
! align=right| 
! align=right| 
! align=right| 
|}

Sources
 The Federal Returning Officer 
 Archived "Wahltest" Voting Advice Application for the Berlin State Elections 2001 used in SFB Election Website 

State election, 2001
2001 elections in Germany
2001 in Berlin
October 2001 events in Europe